Assol (born 1994) is a Ukrainian singer.

Assol or ASSOL may also refer to:

 Antonin Scalia School of Law, a law school in Arlington, Virginia, United States
 Daewoo Lanos, a 1997–2002 South Korean subcompact car, sold in Russia as the Doninvest Assol